Locomotives no. 108 and 109 were a pair of Great Western Railway  steam locomotives built under the aegis of George Armstrong at Wolverhampton Works, probably in 1866–7, as replacements for locomotives of the same numbers inherited from the absorbed Birkenhead Railway.

Design
They had  diameter driving wheels and, unlike other GWR s, only had inside frames. They were nominally rebuilds but only the wheels of the original locomotives seem to have been used.

Use
They worked in the Chester area and were withdrawn in 1887.

References

0108
2-4-0 locomotives
Railway locomotives introduced in 1866